Signal transition, when referring to the modulation of a carrier signal, is a change from one significant condition to another. 

Examples of signal transitions are a change from one electric current, voltage, or power level to another; a change from one optical power level to another; a phase shift; or a change from one frequency or wavelength to another. 

Signal transitions are used to create signals that represent information, such as "0" and "1" or "mark" and "space".

See also

References 

Telecommunication theory
Radio technology